The year 2015 in Japanese music.

Notable events
The sold-out two-day Takashi Matsumoto Official 45th Anniversary Project event was held at the Tokyo International Forum on August 21 and 22, celebrating lyricist Takashi Matsumoto's career. Performances included Matsumoto reuniting with the other two surviving members of pioneering Japanese rock band Happy End.
66th NHK Kōhaku Uta Gassen on December 31.

Number-ones
Oricon number-one albums
Oricon number-one singles
Hot 100 number-one singles

Best-selling records

Best-selling albums
The following is a list of the top 10 best-selling albums in Japan in 2015, according to Oricon.

Best-selling singles
The following is a list of the top 10 best-selling singles in Japan in 2015, according to Oricon.

Awards
57th Japan Record Awards
2015 MTV Video Music Awards Japan

Albums released

January

February

March

April

September

November

December

Debuting

Debuting groups
3776
Akishibu Project
Billie Idle
Bish
Camellia Factory
Earphones
Ebisu Muscats
Exo
Fate Gear
High4
The Hoopers
Idol Renaissance
Iginari Tohoku San
Kolme
La PomPon
Ladybaby
lol
Magnolia Factory
Mrs. Green Apple
Myth & Roid
Official Hige Dandism
OxT
Pasocom Music Club
The Peggies
Pentagon
POP
Srv.Vinci
Sora tob sakana
Suchmos
Tacoyaki Rainbow
Tahiti
Tokimeki Sendenbu
TrySail
Wednesday Campanella
Whiteeeen

Debuting soloists
Aimyon
Anly
Daoko
Inori Minase
Max Changmin
Reol
Sakura Fujiwara

Deaths
  July 6  – Masabumi Kikuchi, Japanese-American pianist and composer (b. 1939)

See also
 2015 in Japan
 2015 in Japanese television
 List of Japanese films of 2015

References